Sand or Send in Iran may refer to:

Gilan Province
 Send-e Bala
 Send-e Pain

Sistan and Baluchestan Province
 Sand-e Bahram
 Sand-e Hamzeh
 Sand-e Mir Suiyan
 Send-e Morad
 Sand-e Nur Mohammad
 Sand-e Mir Suiyan Rural District